Redshank may refer to:

Redshank (soldier), 16th-century Scottish mercenaries

Birds 
Common redshank Tringa totanus, a shorebird
Spotted redshank Tringa erythropus, a shorebird

Plants 
Redshanks Adenostoma sparsifolium, a shrub
Redshank Persicaria maculosa, a plant in the buckwheat family
Redshank Ceratodon purpureus, a moss
Scarce redshank Ceratodon conicus, a moss of Britain and Ireland